The second season of The Great Australian Spelling Bee premiered on 17 July 2016 on Network Ten. The season sees Grant Denyer and Chrissie Swan return as hosts.

Poor ratings for the four initial episodes of the season resulted in the series being moved from Sundays to the lesser viewed Saturday from its fifth episode. From its seventh episode, the show was moved to Network Ten's sister channel, Eleven.

Format
This is the structure of the series for season two:

Laser Letters

In Laser Letters, a new challenge for 2016, each team stand behind a buzzer podium facing the big
screen. The pronouncer will read out four words that appear via a laser projection on the big screen,
visible for a short amount of time. To keep the spellers on their toes, one word will be spelt incorrectly.
Once a speller thinks they have identified the mistake they must buzz in and spell the word correctly.
When they identify and spell the word correctly they win a point for their team. The first two teams to get three points are safe and the other teams will go into the Spelling Bee.

Letter by Letter Knock-Out

Each speller takes a turn to give one letter at a time to spell a given word. When a speller gives the last letter of the word, the next speller states that word to signal that it is finished. 
The pronouncer then gives the next word, and the next speller spells out the first letter of that new word. The challenge continues until a speller makes a mistake. That speller is then out of the round and the challenge continues until there is one speller standing. Three rounds of Letter by Letter Knock Out are played to determine the three spellers to compete in the Ultimate Spelling Bee. The winner of the Ultimate Spelling Bee is the Spelling Bee champion. Tristan won the Great Australian Spelling Bee Champion for 2016.

Show and Spell

Each team member must line up behind a buzzer. Clues and letters are revealed
until a speller buzzes to identify the word that the clues point to. If a speller spells a
correctly identified word accurately, they gain a point for their team. The first two teams to reach a score
of three are safe. The third and final team must face an individual Spelling Bee, where two members will
be sent home.

Speed Spell Duo

With rules similar to Speed Spell Relay, this Speed Spell involves two spellers from the same team stepping into the Spell Gate together. The duo is given 60 seconds to spell as many words
correctly as possible. The spellers will each spell one word at the time taking turns. When a speller makes a mistake that speller will step out of the Spell Gate and the other speller continues spelling. The challenge ends when 60 seconds have passed or both team members have made a mistake. Once all teams have had a turn, the bottom two teams will go into Spelling Bee.

Speed Spell Relay

This Speed Spell is a team relay challenge. One team at a time steps into the super-sized Spell Gate and is given 60 seconds to correctly spell as many words as possible. When a speller makes a mistake that speller will step out of the Spell Gate and the other team members continue. The challenge ends when 60 seconds have passed or all team members have made a mistake. The team with the fewest words spelt at the end of the round will go into Spelling Bee.

Speed Spell Showdown

Each speller steps into the Spell Gate, which lights up during a 60-second countdown. Spellers must spell as many words correctly as possible. If a mistake is made, the speller's time stops. The top speller who completes the most number of correct words in the least amount of time is safe from elimination, while the rest move on to play Spelling Bee.

Spelling Bee (Individual Spelling)

Spellers are divided into groups, with four spellers in each group. Members of each group compete in a traditional spelling bee, where they spell until there are only two spellers left. If all four spellers spell correctly or incorrectly in the same round, they will all spell again until two remain.

Superword

In Superword, duos have to find words in a grid of nine letters revealed on the big screen. Words must
contain five letters or more and include the centre letter. Spellers can use a letter only once and cannot
name a word already given by another team. Whenever a speller of a team thinks that they have identified
a word, they buzz in. Once identified correctly they must spell the word correctly to win a point for their
team. The first five teams to get three points are safe. If a duo identifies the Superword which uses all nine letters, they immediately receive safe passage to the next show. The two bottom teams will play in Spelling Bee.

Superword (Individual Spelling)

In Superword, spellers have to find words in a grid of nine letters revealed on the big screen. Words must contain five letters or more and include the centre letter. Spellers can use a letter only once and cannot name a word already given by another speller. Whenever a speller thinks they have identified
a word they buzz in. Once identified correctly they must spell the word correctly to win a point. The first two spellers to get five points are safe. If a speller identifies the Superword using all
nine letters, they immediately receive safe passage to the next show. The rest move on to play the Spelling Bee.

Season Details

Contestants

Elimination Chart

Episodes

Episode 1 (17 July)

Each of the 36 spellers were put into a group containing four spellers (according to age), with only two from each team making it through to the Top 18.
Luca & Alistair, Annie & Zeke, Hanna & Josie, Max & Tristan, Zoe & Ava, Faiza & Jessica, Beau & James, William & Arya, and Zachary & Rory made it to the Top 18.

Episode 2 (24 July)

The spellers had their first Team challenge of Show & Spell, based on words to do with Space. The spellers were put into 3 different teams of 6 (red, blue yellow ) based on the badge they chose. Each team received a post for each word the team members spelled correctly. Incorrect answers resulted in the team being locked out. The first two teams who got to 3 points first were safe. The remaining team members competed in a Spelling Bee. The first two spellers who spelled their word incorrectly was eliminated.

Notes

The spellers of the spelling bee spelt in this order: Zoe, Hanna, Faiza, Ava, Arya, Luca.
The spelling bee lasted 3 rounds.
Faiza was the only speller who had spelt her word incorrectly in the second round, and so she was eliminated first.
Arya was the only speller who had spelt her word incorrectly in the third round, so she was eliminated.
Team Blue: James Jessica Josie Alistair Max & Zeke 
Team Red: Rory William Annie Zachary Tristan & Beau 
Team Yellow: Luca Arya Hanna Ava Zoe & Faiza

Episode 3 (31 July)

Notes

Teams went up to spell in this order: Green, Yellow, Blue, Red.
All spellers in the Green and Blue teams had correctly spelt their words, but Max in the Red team and Luca in the Yellow team had spelt their word incorrectly, at the 7th and 11th words respectively.
Both spellers who spelt their words incorrectly were the third member of the team to spell.
Luca stepped out of the gate while time was up, but they had already surpassed the word count of the Red team.
The spellers of the spelling bee spelt in this order: James, Max, Alistair, Josie.
The spelling bee lasted two rounds.
The second round James spelling his word incorrectly, Max correctly, Alistair incorrectly confirming Max to be safe, and Josie correctly, eliminating James and Alistair.
Team Blue: Jessica Zachary Rory Hanna, got 11 Points 
Team Green: Zoe Ava William Annie, got 11 Points 
Team Yellow: Beau Zeke Luca Tristan, got 10 Points 
Team Red: Alistair James Max Josie, got 9 Points

Episode 4 (7 August)

The spellers compete in a new challenge Superword.

Notes

No speller had correctly identified the Superword, being "Periscope".
The spellers of the spelling bee spelt in this order: Beau, Jessica, Zeke, and William.
The spelling bee of this episode only lasted one round, as Beau and William had spelt their first words wrong.

Episode 5 (13 August)

Episode 6 (20 August)

The spellers take on the spell gate again to compete in Speed Spell Duo.

Episode 7 (27 August)

The spellers compete in a new challenge Laser Letters. This involves the identification of a spelling mistake and spelling it correctly in order to get a point. The first two teams to get 3 points will be safe. The 2 teams that didn't achieve 3 points will go to the Spelling Bee, where 2 contestants will be eliminated.

Episode 8 (3 September)

The spellers compete for a second time in Superword.

Episode 9 (10 September)

The spellers take on the spell gate again to compete in Speed Spell Showdown.

Episode 10 (17 September)

The Spellers compete in Letter by Letter Knock-Out. Tristan went on to win the Final Spelling Bee, his winning word was "centrifuge".

Ratings

 Colour key:
  Highest rating episode during the series
  Lowest rating episode during the series

References

2016 Australian television seasons